The National Association of Real Estate Brokers (NAREB) was established on July 29, 1947, making it the oldest minority business association in the Americas. NAREB was created by African American real estate professionals as an alternative space for African Americans who were excluded from the National Association of Realtors.   
 
NAREB members are called realtists (rather than REALTORs) and represent all professional disciplines within the real estate industry including residential and commercial real estate agents and brokers, loan officers, mortgage brokers, title companies, appraisers, insurance agents and developers.

Headquartered in Lanham, Maryland, NAREB is governed by a board of directors and an executive committee composed of members and leaders, in the industry, from across America.  Each local chapter continuously accepts new members.

History

NAREB was founded by twelve individuals, one woman and eleven men from seven states across the United States. NAREB held its first convention at the Convention Hall in Atlantic City, N.J., between July 19–20, 1948.

Dr. Martin Luther King Jr. spoke at the NAREB National Mid-Winter Conference that was held in February 1968, in San Francisco, California a few months before he was assassinated. During his speech King talked about how a privately managed "Marshall Plan", similar to the one initiated in Europe following World War II, was needed to revitalize America's inner cities. King stated that in America's inner cities a ten-billion dollar investment over ten years from the government would help attract or develop new businesses as well as maintain and improve existing businesses. In this revitalized urban economy, the employed inner city residents would become homeowners, he said, thus improving the social and economic climate of their communities.

Organization

NAREB's 2017-2018 leadership includes Jeffrey Hicks, President; Donnell Williams, First Vice President; Lydia Pope, Second Vice President; Courtney Johnson Rose, Third Vice President, Lawrence Butler, Treasurer; Derrick Jackson, Assistant Treasurer; Shelia Collette, Secretary; Ketriena Kier, Asst. Secretary, Edward London, Chaplin, H. Bernie Jackson, Parliamentarian, and Charles Gilyard, Sergeant-at-Arms.

Over its 69-year history, two women have led the organization as President: Evelyn A. Reeves
and Maria Kong.  In 2005, Catherine Dorsey was named co-chairman of the NAREB.  She was the first woman named to the post. The current chairman and vice-chairman of the Board are Robert Hughes and Michelle Callaway, respectively.

Affiliates

NAREB's affiliates consist of the following:
 
National Society of Real Estate Appraisers
Commercial Industrial Division
National Investment Division
United Developers Council
Real Estate Management Brokers Institute
Young Realtists Division
Sales Division
Women's Council of NAREB
Home Ownership Counselors
Construction Division

Women’s Council of NAREB

The Women's Council of NAREB, one of NAREB's ten affiliate organizations, is a nonprofit organization that focuses on community grassroots.  The organization's mission is to evaluate the standards of women in the real estate industry by facilitating leadership, education, and the exchange of information through group learning techniques; and to provide the opportunity for women to increase their knowledge and expertise of all facets of the real estate profession.  Lydia Kirkland served as the organization's 2011 president. Founded in Atlanta, Georgia, in 1971, officers and bylaws were established and Laura Seale became the first president of the Women's Council.  Currently, it has over 18 chapters nationwide and women comprise 53 percent of the NAREB's membership, with participation in all divisions and aspects of the organization.

Staff

NAREB, over the years, has operated mainly as a member managed organization.  However, in 2001, Lee Bowman became the official executive director of NAREB, ultimately, serving in the role of the organization's Executive Consultant, until 2004.  He also, had been since 2000 President and CEO of Lee Bowman & Associates, a Baltimore community development and finance consulting company. Prior to joining NAREB, Bowman served for six years as Mid-Atlantic Regional Director; Director of Housing and Community Development at Fannie Mae.

Brenda Brown became the first woman to serve as the Executive Consultant for NAREB.  Previously, at the National Association of Realtors (NAR), Brown developed a comprehensive diversity program based on former U.S. President Bill Clinton's initiative on race called One America Initiative.

In April 2015, Antoine M. Thompson, became the National Executive Director of NAREB.  A former New York State Senator, former Buffalo City Council and former executive director for two other quasi-governmental not for profits. He is the author of Buffalo's Fair Housing Law and various city and state laws that promote workforce and business diversity.  Thompson was hired to help transition the association to a corporate and staff driven  organization bolstered by dedicated volunteers.

Thompson has helped NAREB strengthen its members benefits programs, developed an online school, implemented monthly educational courses for member business development.  Thompson helped develop the concept for Black Homeownership Matters, NAREB's new initiative to create 2 million new Black homeowners.  He has also enhanced NAREB's presence on Capitol Hill by helping to lead annual meetings with Members of Congress, H.UD.  and the White House.

Current
In early August 2011, at its national convention in New Orleans, LA, NAREB announced a historic engagement with Wall Street investors to launch an $800 million Homeowner's Assurance Program (HAP) to address the devastating effects of the housing mortgage crisis on African-Americans and other communities of color across the United States.

In March 2011, NAREB, along with two other organizations representing multicultural real estate professionals - the National Association of Hispanic Real Estate Professionals (NAHREP) and the Asian Real Estate Association of America (AREAA) - convened at the Multicultural Real Estate & Policy Conference in Washington, D.C. to discuss regulatory and policy changes to preserve access to homeownership for people of color.  As a result of that meeting the organizations issued a joint report entitled "The Five Point Plan: Refocusing the Future of Minority Homeownership."

In 2010, NAREB announced the formation of two partnerships with organizations focused on addressing the needs of communities of people of color.  In July, NAREB partnered with Integrated Mortgage Solutions (IMS), the only woman-owned collateral protection firm offering resources for the mortgage servicing sector.  Additionally, NAREB announced its partnership with PartnerFirst, LLC, a provider of resources to mortgage services and outsourcers, creating a certified, nationwide, and multicultural short sale agent network to help communities of color across the United States avoid foreclosure.

References

External links
 National Association of Real Estate Brokers

Real estate companies established in 1947
Organizations established in 1947
Real estate services companies of the United States
Organizations based in Maryland
Trade associations based in the United States
1947 establishments in the United States